Pan and Echo (in Swedish ; subtitled Dance intermezzo), Op. 53a, is a short character piece for orchestra written in 1906 by the Finnish composer by Jean Sibelius. He conducted the first performance in Helsinki on 24 March 1906 with the Orchestra of Helsinki Philharmonic Society. He arranged it for piano in 1907.

Literature 
 Tomi Mäkelä: "Jean Sibelius und seine Zeit" (German), Laaber-Verlag, Regensburg 2013

References

External links 
 

Symphonic poems by Jean Sibelius
1906 compositions